Sri Nallapochamma - Moodu Gullu Temple is a temple in the Old Neredmet neighbourhood of Hyderabad in the Indian State of Telangana. Temple which is 120 years old. Devotees offer prayers to the goddess every day. In particular, Thousands of devotees offer prayers during Ashada Jathara, which usually falls on Sundays.

Hindu temples in Hyderabad district

The temple is very popular landmark for surrounding areas as Three Temple Bus Stop formally (Neredmettu Village Bus Stop) on Malkajgiri-Neredmet X Roads Route.